Kunuz College is a private college in Ethiopia located near Wingate Square, Addis Ababa. Established in 2002, the institution provides courses in  Business,  Accounting, Marketing, Human Resource Management, Information Technology, Law and Secretarial Science . The previous advisory of KC was the Former Federal Democratic Republic of Ethiopia Dr. Negasso Gidada.

The college is a member of the Private Higher Education Institutions, and provides Level 3 certificate and Level 4 diploma, and degree programs. T

The Ministry of Education accredits the programs of the college. Admission of students is based on the criteria set by the Ministry of Education. The college has a student body of 800.

The president of KC is Mr. Tesfaye Lega.

References

Universities and colleges in Ethiopia
Education in Addis Ababa
2002 establishments in Ethiopia

de:Universität Addis Abeba
ja:アディスアベバ大学